Sheba and the Gladiator is a 1959 historical drama film loosely pertaining to the Palmyrene Empire and its re-annexation back into the Roman Empire.

Cast
 Anita Ekberg as Zenobia
 Georges Marchal as Consul Marcus Valerius
 Folco Lulli as Zemanzius
 Chelo Alonso as Erica
 Gino Cervi as Aurelian
 Jacques Sernas as Julianus
Lorella De Luca as  Batsheba
Alberto Farnese as  Marcello
Mimmo Palmara as  Lator

Production
Sheba the Gladiator was shot in 1958. Director Guido Brignone fell ill during the production on the film leading to two other directors to enter the production to help complete it: Michelangelo Antonioni and Riccardo Freda. For Antonioni, he visited Brignone in the hospital and reported on what he filmed and received instructions for the next day. Freda was in charge shooting the battle scenes which he did with cinematographer Mario Bava and Antonioni working with cinematographer Luciano Trasatti shooting the indoor scenes. Other people credited to the film included Sergio Leone as a screenwriter.

Mimmo Palmara commented that Antonioni "couldn't care less" about the film and "didn't direct the actors." Freda had an argument with Palmara and unsuccessfully tried to court Chelo Alonso on set.

Release
Sheba and the Gladiator was distributed in Italy on March 5, 1959. It was released in West Germany as Im Zeichen Roms on 2 October 1959.

American International Pictures acquired the American rights to the film and re-titled it Sign of the Gladiator (Sign of Rome "was a pretty dismal title" according to Samuel Z. Arkoff) and cut 18 minutes from the original running time. There was no gladiator in the film so they redubbed it to change the general played by Jacques Sernas into a gladiator.

It was released in September 1959 in the United States. American International Pictures added an end title song called "Xenobia" sung by Bill Lee which was released on AIP Records. The film grossed a total of $1.25 million in rentals. "We did quite well with the picture" said Samuel Z Arkoff.

Kine Weekly called it a "money maker" at the British box office in 1960.

See also
List of historical drama films
List of films set in ancient Rome
Crisis of the Third Century

References

Citations

Sources

External links
 

1959 films
1950s historical films
Peplum films
French historical drama films
West German films
German historical drama films
Yugoslav historical drama films
Films directed by Guido Brignone
Films with screenplays by Sergio Leone
Films set in ancient Rome
Films set in the Roman Empire
Films set in the 3rd century
Films set in classical antiquity
American International Pictures films
Films scored by Angelo Francesco Lavagnino
Sword and sandal films
Cultural depictions of Aurelian
1950s Italian films
1950s German films